Kent is an unincorporated community in Elmore County, Alabama, United States, located on Alabama State Route 229,  north-northwest of Tallassee. Kent had a post office from November 29, 1913, until August 20, 1988; it still has its own ZIP code, 36045.

References

Unincorporated communities in Elmore County, Alabama
Unincorporated communities in Alabama